Kin Beach Provincial Park is a Class C provincial park in British Columbia, Canada, located just northwest of Kye Bay, to the north of Comox, British Columbia. As a Class "C" park, it is managed locally by a park board.

References

Mid Vancouver Island
Provincial parks of British Columbia
1966 establishments in British Columbia
Protected areas established in 1966